Acheilognathus tabira erythropterus is a subspecies of Acheilognathus tabira.

References

Acheilognathus